The 1971 Southeast Asian Peninsular Games, officially known as the 6th Southeast Asian Peninsular Games, was a Southeast Asian multi-sport event held in Kuala Lumpur, Malaysia from 6 to 13 December 1971 with 15 sports featured in the games. In this edition of the games, host country Malaysia joined Singapore in pressuring Thailand to let the SEAP Games Federation expand to include the Philippines and Indonesia, but to no avail. Thai officials felt that such expansion would be contrary to the small family affair they had intended the games to be, and would not be in keeping with the close-neighbours spirit the games was supposed to cultivate. This was the second time Malaysia hosted the games and its first time since 1965. The games was opened and closed by Abdul Halim, the King of Malaysia at the Stadium Merdeka. The final medal tally was led by Thailand, followed by host Malaysia and Singapore.

The games

Participating nations

Sports

Aquatics
Aquatics included swimming, diving and water polo events. The three sports of aquatics were held in Kuala Lumpur, Malaysia. Aquatics events was held between 12 and 15 December.

Swimming

Diving

Water polo

Medal table

Key

References

External links
 History of the SEA Games
 Medal Tally 1959-1995
 Medal Tally
 OCA SEA Games
 SEA Games previous medal table
 SEAGF Office  
 SEA Games members

 

 
Southeast Asian Games
Southeast Asian Peninsular Games, 1971